The Hakobuchi Formation is a geological formation in Hokkaido, Japan. It is the uppermost unit of the Yezo Group, being early Maastrichtian in age. It consists of bioturbated glauconitic sandstones, siltstones and conglomerates with coaly mudstone and minor tuffite. It was deposited in a continental shelf setting. It is noted for its fossil content with the invertebrates mainly consisting of bivalves and ammonites. With vertebrates including the mosasaurs Mosasaurus hobetsuensis and Phosphorosaurus ponpetelegans. As well the sea turtle Mesodermochelys and the hadrosaurid dinosaur Kamuysaurus.

References

Upper Cretaceous Series of Asia
Maastrichtian Stage